The SNCASE SE-3101 or Sud-Est SE-3101 was an early, experimental French helicopter with twin tail rotors. Only one was built.

Design and development
The SE-3101 is an early, experimental helicopter, developed by the German aviation pioneer Henrich Focke. The helicopter is probably the first French example to have tail anti-torque rotors. It has a single  main rotor and a similar layout to many modern helicopters, apart from its use of a double tail rotor.  These are mounted with their axes at 45° to the horizontal and with 90° between them, the drive shafts faired within a V-tail-like rear structure. They drive three blade, compressed wood airscrews of 1.60 m (5 ft 2.5 in) diameter.  The three blades of the main rotor each have a steel spar and are fabric covered; rotor diameter is 7.50 m (24 ft 7 in)

The fuselage of the SE-3101 is an uncovered, rectangular cross-section, steel tube structure.  An 85 hp (63 kW) Mathis G4R flat four engine is mounted within the fuselage, immediately below the main rotor and behind the pilot, who is provided with some instrumentation and is sheltered by a flat windscreen. The aircraft has a fixed, wheeled tricycle undercarriage, assisted by a small tail skid. First flown on 15 June 1948, development of the SE-3101 led to the Sud-Est SE-3110 and the single tail rotor SE.3120, though none of them entered production.

Aircraft on display

Musée de l’Air et de l’Espace, Le Bourget: The sole SE-3101, F-WFDQ

Specifications

References

Single-engined piston helicopters
1940s French helicopters
SE-3101
1940s French experimental aircraft
Aircraft first flown in 1948